The fourth government of Jordi Pujol was formed on 16 April 1992 following the latter's reelection as President of Catalonia by the Parliament of Catalonia on 9 April and his swearing-in on 15 April, as a result of the Convergence and Union (CiU) alliance emerging as the largest parliamentary force at the 1992 Catalan regional election and securing a third consecutive absolute majority.

The cabinet was an all-CiU government, comprising members of the Democratic Convergence of Catalonia (CDC) and its sister party, the Democratic Union of Catalonia (UDC). It was automatically dismissed on 20 November 1995 as a consequence of the 1995 regional election, but remained in acting capacity until the next government was sworn in.

Investiture

Executive Council
The Executive Council was structured into the office for the president and 13 ministries.

Notes

References

Cabinets established in 1992
Cabinets disestablished in 1996
Cabinets of Catalonia